Eta Muscae is a multiple star system in the southern constellation of Musca. It is visible to the naked eye as a faint, blue-white hued point of light with an apparent visual magnitude of 4.79. The system is located around 406 light years away from the Sun. It is a member of the Lower Centaurs Crux subgroup of the Sco OB2 stellar association of co-moving stars.

The two main components of this system form a double-lined spectroscopic binary with a period of 2.4 days in a circular orbit. They are a detached eclipsing binary with a spectral type of B8V and a brightness that dips by 0.05 magnitude once per orbit. This pair consists of two components of similar mass and type.

Further away from the primary system are stars of magnitude 7.3 and 10, designated Eta Muscae B and C. It is unclear if these stars are gravitationally–bound to the main pair. Evidence for an additional component has been found with a 30-year cycle in the orbital behavior of the main pair. The data suggests an orbital eccentricity of 0.29 for this suspected component, Eta Muscae D.

References

B-type main-sequence stars
Lower Centaurus Crux
Spectroscopic binaries
Eclipsing binaries

Musca (constellation)
Muscae, Eta
Durchmusterung objects
114911
64661
4993